Otto Wahle (5 November 1879 – 11 August 1963) was an Austrian-American swimmer who took part in two Summer Olympic Games and won a total of three medals. Wahle coached the men's US swim team at the 1912 Olympics, and the men's US water polo team at the 1920 and 1924 Olympics.

Swimming career
At age 20, Wahle competed in three events at the 1900 Summer Olympics in Paris, France. He competed in the 200 metre freestyle and won his heat, but, for an unknown reason, he did not compete in the final. He also entered the 1000 metre freestyle; in his heat he came second behind Hungarian swimmer Zoltán Halmay, but he still qualified for the final the next day. In the final he was beaten by John Arthur Jarvis from Great Britain but finished ahead of Halmay to win the silver medal. Wahle also won a silver medal in the 200 metre obstacle event. After winning his heat, Wahle missed the gold medal by under two seconds to Australian swimmer Frederick Lane.

In 1901, Wahle moved to New York City and was taken in by the New York Athletic Club. Three years later, he competed at the 1904 Summer Olympics. The Games were held in St. Louis, Missouri, and again Wahle entered three events. He finished in fourth place in the 1 mile freestyle, and he finished in fifth place in the 880 yard freestyle. Wahle won a bronze medal in the 440 yard freestyle, finishing behind Charles Daniels and Francis Gailey.

Coaching career and later life
In 1906, Wahle became a US citizen. He became the American swimming team coach for the 1912 Summer Olympics, where he coached future Gen. George S. Patton Jr. for the swimming event in the pentathlon. At the 1920 and 1924 Summer Olympics, he was the coach of the American water polo team.

Wahle played a major role in the growth of swimming as a competitive sport in the United States and wrote many of the rules listed in early Amateur Athletic Union manuals.

He died in 1963 in Forest Hills, Queens, and was inducted in to the International Swimming Hall of Fame in 1968. In 1990, he was inducted into the USA Water Polo Hall of Fame.

See also
 List of members of the International Swimming Hall of Fame
List of select Jewish swimmers

References

External links
 

1879 births
1963 deaths
Swimmers from Vienna
Jewish American sportspeople
Jewish swimmers
Olympic swimmers of Austria
Swimmers at the 1900 Summer Olympics
Swimmers at the 1904 Summer Olympics
Olympic silver medalists for Austria
Olympic bronze medalists for Austria
Jewish Austrian sportspeople
American people of Austrian-Jewish descent
Olympic bronze medalists in swimming
Medalists at the 1904 Summer Olympics
Medalists at the 1900 Summer Olympics
Austrian male freestyle swimmers
Olympic silver medalists in swimming
American water polo coaches
Austro-Hungarian emigrants to the United States
Male long-distance swimmers
Sportspeople from the Austro-Hungarian Empire